Mallikarjuna Raya (or Deva Raya III) (born 1420, r. 1446–1465 CE) was an emperor of the Vijayanagara Empire from the Sangama Dynasty.

Mallikarjuna Raya succeeded his father Deva Raya II, who had brought prosperity throughout the Vijayanagara empire as well as a golden age for the Sangama Dynasty. However, Mallikarjuna Raya was unlike his father, and was generally a weak and corrupt ruler.

At the beginning of his reign he defended the kingdom from the attacks of the Bahamani Sultan and the Gajapati Emperor of the Hindu empire of Kalinga-Utkal Odisha, which then stretched from the Ganges to the Kaveri, but thereafter it was marked by a string of defeats. The Gajapatis conquered Rajamahendri in 1454 and Udayagiri and Chandragiri in 1463. The Bahamani kingdoms took over much of the Vijayanagara Empire by 1450 and grew closer to the capital. 

These events eventually led to the decline of the Sangama Dynasty; Mallikarjuna Raya's nephew Virupaksha Raya II took the opportunity to seize the throne, though he failed to prove a better ruler. It is unknown what happened to Mallikarjuna after that.

References
 Dr. Suryanath U. Kamat, Concise history of Karnataka, MCC, Bangalore, 2001 (Reprinted 2002)

External links
AP Online

1465 deaths
15th-century Indian monarchs
People of the Vijayanagara Empire
1446 births
Indian Hindus
Year of birth unknown
Hindu monarchs
Sangama dynasty